The 46th International Emmy Awards took place November 19, 2018 at the New York Hilton Midtown in New York City. The award ceremony, presented by the International Academy of Television Arts and Sciences (IATAS), honors all TV programming produced and originally aired outside the United States and celebrated excellence in International television.

Ceremony
Nominations for the 46th International Emmy Awards were announced on September 27, 2018, by the International Academy of Television Arts & Sciences (IATAS). Nominees come from Australia, Belgium, Brazil, Canada, Chile, Denmark, Germany, India, Israel, Japan, Mexico, Netherlands, Portugal, Spain, South Africa, South Korea, Thailand, Turkey, United Kingdom and the United States.

In addition to the presentation of the International Emmys for programming and performances, the International Academy presented two special awards. Greg Berlanti received the Founders Award, and Sophie Turner Laing of Endemol Shine Group, received the Directorate Award.

Summary

Winners and nominees

References

External links 
 Official website

International Emmy Awards ceremonies
International
International